Mind's Eye is the first studio album by guitarist Vinnie Moore, released in 1986 through Shrapnel Records. Recorded in eleven days when Moore was 21 years old, the album was ranked third on the all-time top ten list of shred albums in a 2009 article by Guitar World magazine.

Critical reception

Robert Taylor at AllMusic gave Mind's Eye four stars out of five, calling it "a classic in the shredder community", albeit "just a display of technical ability to the casual listener." Praise was given to Moore for being "one of the more interesting of the shredders", but Taylor also labeled him as an Yngwie Malmsteen clone. "In Control" and "Saved by a Miracle" were listed as highlights. Canadian journalist Martin Popoff called the album "a mature, triumphant, very professional record" and lauded the musicians and Mike Varney's production.

Track listing

Personnel
Musicians
Vinnie Moore – guitar
Tony MacAlpine – keyboards
Andy West – bass
Tommy Aldridge – drums

Production
Mike Varney – producer
Steve Fontano – engineer, producer
Dino Alden – assistant engineer
George Horn – mastering

References

External links
In Review: Vinnie Moore "Mind's Eye" at Guitar Nine Records

Vinnie Moore albums
1986 debut albums
Shrapnel Records albums
Albums produced by Mike Varney
Roadrunner Records albums